George Rowlands Antonio (20 October 1914 – 2 July 1997) was an English footballer of Italian descent who played in the Football League for Derby County, Doncaster Rovers, Mansfield Town and Stoke City.

Career
Antonio was born in Whitchurch, Shropshire, starting in the same county with non-league Oswestry Town before joining Stoke City in 1935. He made his Stoke debut against Liverpool on the final day of the 1935–36 season and established himself in the side the following season. He scored twice in a 10–3 win over West Bromwich Albion, Stoke's record victory. He played quite regularly in the next two seasons sharing positions with Bobby Liddle. During World War II he guested for Nottingham Forest making three appearances in 1939–40 and seven appearances scoring 2 goals in 1940–41. In the 1945–46 season, he guested for Ipswich Town as well as a number of other clubs. He played 16 times for Stoke in 1946–47 season scoring five goals before joining Derby County in March 1947. In the year he was at Derby he played 18 matches and scored twice. He joined Doncaster Rovers for the 1948–49 season appearing 34 times and scoring seven goals, then signed for Mansfield Town from 1949 to 1950 playing 67, scoring twice.

Career statistics
Source:

References

External links
 

1914 births
1997 deaths
People from Whitchurch, Shropshire
Footballers from Shropshire
English footballers
English people of Italian descent
Association football inside forwards
Oswestry Town F.C. players
Stoke City F.C. players
Derby County F.C. players
Doncaster Rovers F.C. players
Mansfield Town F.C. players
Telford United F.C. players
Stafford Rangers F.C. players
Berriew F.C. players
English Football League players
Nottingham Forest F.C. wartime guest players
Ipswich Town F.C. wartime guest players
York City F.C. wartime guest players
English football managers
Italian British sportspeople
Stafford Rangers F.C. managers
Oswestry Town F.C. managers